Marko Mugoša (born 4 April 1984) is a Montenegrin retired football midfielder.

Club career
Born in Podgorica, he played with FK Budućnost Podgorica in the beginning of his career, and beside them he also represented FK Borac Čačak in the Serbian SuperLiga. 2010 he moved to Red Star. Same year he  was loaned to FK Budućnost Podgorica. 2011 he was loaned to FK Jagodina and FK Novi Pazar. In 2015, he joined Swedish side Landskrona BoIS where he played 5 games.

External links
 Marko Mugoša Stats at Utakmica.rs

1984 births
Living people
Footballers from Podgorica
Association football midfielders
Serbia and Montenegro footballers
Montenegrin footballers
FK Budućnost Podgorica players
FK Borac Čačak players
Red Star Belgrade footballers
FK Jagodina players
FK Novi Pazar players
FK Mogren players
Landskrona BoIS players
OFK Grbalj players
FK Kom players
First League of Serbia and Montenegro players
Serbian SuperLiga players
Montenegrin First League players
Serbian First League players
Ettan Fotboll players
Montenegrin expatriate footballers
Expatriate footballers in Serbia
Montenegrin expatriate sportspeople in Serbia
Expatriate footballers in Sweden
Montenegrin expatriate sportspeople in Sweden